Louis Auguste Joseph Desrousseaux  (27 July 1753 – 20 January 1838) was a French botanist and pteridologist. He was a contributor to the "Encyclopedia Botanique" of Lamarck, from 1783 to 1796.

Desrousseaux produced many works on new plant species, creating 414 new records.

In 1828, botanist Augustin Pyramus de Candolle (DC.) published Rousseauxia, a genus of flowering plants from Madagascar, belonging to the family Melastomataceae and named in honour of Louis Auguste Joseph Desrousseaux.

External links
 List of all genera and species described by this author in IPNI

References 

18th-century French botanists
Pteridologists
1753 births
1838 deaths
19th-century French botanists